Eichhorn is a German surname meaning “squirrel”. Notable people with the surname include:

Albert Eichhorn (1856–1926), historian of religion
Christoph Eichhorn (born 1957), German television actor and director
David Max Eichhorn (1906–1986), rabbi, army chaplain and author
Dennis Eichhorn (1945-2015), American writer
Emil Eichhorn (1863–1925), German politician and police chief
Johann Gottfried Eichhorn (1753–1827), German theologian
Hermann von Eichhorn (1848–1918), German World War I Generalfeldmarschall
Jan-Armin Eichhorn (born 1981), German luger
Karl Friedrich Eichhorn (1781–1854), German jurist
Kurt Eichhorn (1908–1994), German conductor
Lisa Eichhorn (born 1952), American actress, writer and producer
Mark Eichhorn (born 1960), retired Major League Baseball pitcher 
Susan Eichhorn Young, Canadian operatic soprano
Urs Eichhorn (born 1979), Swiss curler

See also
 Eichhorn in East Prussia, the German name of Wiewiórki, Warmian-Masurian Voivodeship
 The similarly-spelt German surname Aichhorn

German-language surnames
Surnames from nicknames